Zadarski memento is a Croatian film directed by Joakim Marušić. It was released in 1984.

External links
 

1984 films
Croatian drama films
1980s Croatian-language films
Yugoslav drama films
1984 directorial debut films